Leire Martínez Ochoa (born 22 June 1979 in Errenteria, Guipúzcoa), is a Spanish singer, songwriter and the current lead vocalist of the band La Oreja de Van Gogh after Amaia Montero's departure in 2007.

She participated in the television show Factor X in 2007 performing covers of Julieta Venegas, Vanessa Paradis and Lisa Stansfield. She was eliminated on the 6th week. In 2008, after her performances in Factor X, Leire was selected to replace Amaia Montero in La Oreja de Van Gogh. With Leire, the band has released the albums A las cinco en el Astoria, Cometas por el Cielo, El planeta imaginario, and Un susurro en la tormenta.

Discography

With La Oreja de Van Gogh

Studio albums
 A las cinco en el Astoria (2008)
 Nuestra casa a la izquierda del tiempo (2009) Old songs, new arrangements sung by Leire
 Cometas por el cielo (2011)
 El planeta imaginario (2016)
 Un Susurro en la Tormenta (2020)

Singles
 El Último Vals (2008)
 Inmortal (2008)
 Jueves (2009)
 Europa VII (2009)
 Cuéntame al Oído (2009)
 Puedes Contar Conmigo (2010)
 La niña que llora en tus fiestas (2011)
 Cometas por el cielo (2011)

Guests
 Himno de la Real Sociedad – with Alex Ubago, Mikel Erentxun, and others (2009)
 Deseos de cosas imposibles – with Conchita (2010)
 Nada que perder – with Conchita (2010)
 ¡Ay Haiti! – with Carlos Jean, Marta Sánchez and others (2010)
 Hecho con tus sueños – with Efecto Pasillo (2013)

References

External links
 Leire's official website
 the Band's official website

1979 births
Basque-language singers
Basque musicians
Women rock singers
Living people
People from Errenteria
Spanish rock singers
Spanish singer-songwriters
The X Factor contestants
Spanish women pop singers
21st-century Spanish women singers
Rock en Español musicians
21st-century Spanish singers